Pablo Oscar Parmo (born August 19, 1979 in Lomas de Zamora (Buenos Aires), Argentina) is a former Argentine footballer who played for clubs of Argentina, Chile, Uruguay, Venezuela, Spain, Switzerland and Finland.

Teams
  Racing Club de Montevideo 2000
  Fénix 2000-2001
  Inter Turku 2001-2002
  VG-62 Naantali 2002-2003
  Inter Turku 2003-2004
  YF Juventus 2005
  Cobreloa 2006
  Trujillanos 2007
  Arnedo 2008-2009

References
 

1972 births
Living people
Argentine footballers
Argentine expatriate footballers
Racing Club de Montevideo players
Trujillanos FC players
FC Inter Turku players
Cobreloa footballers
SC Young Fellows Juventus players
Chilean Primera División players
Veikkausliiga players
Expatriate footballers in Chile
Expatriate footballers in Uruguay
Expatriate footballers in Venezuela
Expatriate footballers in Spain
Expatriate footballers in Finland
Expatriate footballers in Switzerland
Club Atlético Fénix players
Association football midfielders
People from Lomas de Zamora
Sportspeople from Buenos Aires Province